Birka was a Viking-age trading center in Sweden.

Birka may also refer to:

Places
Virk, Jalandhar, Punjab, India, a village sometimes known as Birka
Wagh El Birket, a former red-light district in Cairo

Ships
Birka Line, an Ålandian shipping company
MS Birka Stockholm, a cruise ship owned by Birka Line
Birka Princess, a cruise ship built for Birka Line
MS Birka Queen, the original name of the cruise ship MS Norwegian Majesty
SS Main (1926), a German cargo ship renamed Birka in 1955
A German hospital ship sunk during World War II by the submarine HMS Triden (N52)

Other
 A font family designed by Franko Luin

See also
Burka (disambiguation)
Burk (disambiguation)
Berk (disambiguation)
Birkaland (disambiguation)